Alan Dedicoat (born 1 December 1954) is an English announcer for programmes on BBC One. He is known as the "Voice of the Balls" on the National Lottery programmes, providing a voiceover for the draws since 1995. He was a BBC Radio 2 newsreader until his retirement from this role in March 2015. Dedicoat is the announcer on BBC One's Strictly Come Dancing and its American version, Dancing with the Stars.

Early life

Dedicoat was born on 1 December 1954 in Hollywood, Worcestershire. The son of a newsagent, Dedicoat was educated at King Edward VI Camp Hill School for Boys in Birmingham, and the University of Birmingham. Dedicoat originally worked in the Civil Service as an Executive Officer, before joining the BBC.

Career

Radio 
Dedicoat joined BBC Radio WM at Pebble Mill in 1979 as a presenter, before moving to BBC Radio Devon four years later. After working in the West Country, he moved to London to join the Presentation Department of BBC Radio 2 in 1986 at Broadcasting House, and later became its head, a position he retained until his retirement in 2015. As part of this job, he read the news on BBC Radio 2's weekday breakfast programme, Wake Up to Wogan, until its final edition in December 2009. He also performed this role on Sarah Kennedy's show, until she left the station in August 2010. He then became the newsreader for Vanessa Feltz in January 2011, but following a reshuffle of newsreaders in September 2012, his final shift was reading the news on weekdays between 10am and 5pm. He was also the voice of Radio 2's "emergency CD" (played when there is a fire alarm or other unforeseen break in programming) and their multiple choice automatic phone menu.

After 28 years at the station, Dedicoat's final news bulletin on BBC Radio 2 was at 5pm on Friday 27 March 2015, as he retired from Radio 2 broadcasting. It was as part of Wake Up to Wogan that Dedicoat acquired the nickname "Voice of the Balls" from presenter Sir Terry Wogan; he was also called "The Wealdstone WeatherBoy" due to Wealdstone's close proximity to Harrow, where Dedicoat lives. In 2017, he joined Bauer Radio's digital station Mellow Magic, as the breakfast show newsreader for his former Wake Up To Wogan colleague Fran Godfrey.

Television 
In 1994, the National Lottery and its draw programmes were launched on BBC Television. The following year, Dedicoat began working as the show's announcer. He also takes part in the BBC's telethons, such as Children in Need, announcing the totals at certain intervals. Dedicoat voices previews and the voice-overs in Strictly Come Dancing on BBC One. In 2005, he became the announcer for Dancing with the Stars, the American version of Strictly Come Dancing, which broadcasts annually (previously semi-annually) on Disney+ (ABC in 2005–2021). Since 2009, he has been the voice-over for the CBBC show Copycats. In the late 1980s and 1990s, he was a regular voiceover artist for trailers on BBC Television.

Controversy 
In 2015, a recording of Dedicoat was obtained by The Sun newspaper, in which he allegedly claimed that the BBC allowed a "drug peddler" to deliver Class A substances to the desks of staff. He subsequently apologised and retracted his comments.

Other work 
Dedicoat is also an after dinner speaker.

Personal life
Dedicoat is the co-owner of multiple examples of the AEC Routemaster (the best-known London red bus) with fellow broadcasters Charles Nove, Ken Bruce and Steve Madden. He is Patron of the Hospital Broadcasting Association, and has taken part in the National Hospital Radio Awards, both as the voiceover and in person. In addition, Dedicoat is the President of Hospital Radio Bedside, a hospital radio station broadcasting to hospitals in Bournemouth, Poole, Christchurch and Wimborne in the UK.

Dedicoat lives in Harrow on the Hill, London.

References

External links 
 
BBC Radio 2 biography
BBC Radio News Biography

1954 births
Living people
Alumni of the University of Birmingham
English television presenters
People educated at King Edward VI Camp Hill School for Boys
People from Bromsgrove District
Radio and television announcers
BBC Radio 2 presenters